Collingham F.C. may refer to:

 Collingham F.C. (Nottinghamshire)
 Collingham F.C. (West Yorkshire)